Macadam Tribu is a 1996 comedy-drama produced by José Zeka Laplaine in the Democratic Republic of the Congo. The film was selected as the Democratic Republic of the Congo's entry for the Best Foreign Language Film at the 70th Academy Awards, but was not accepted as a nominee.

Plot
Two brothers,  Mike (recently released from prison) and Kapa roam the streets, bars and boxing halls with Duka, their neighborhood friend.
Duka is the result of a not-so-secret fling with Papa Sandu, who owns the neighborhood bar.
In the evening, everyone ends up in the bar to discuss the events of the day, the street and the TV.
This is also where Bavusi, the mother of Mike and Kapa, comes to remember better times. Other people of the neighborhood who meet at the bar include a policeman and prostitutes. Each has their place. One day, Duka decides to return to the ring to face the great champion Kabeya. The whole neighborhood is there to support him, but the fight goes wrong and Duka falls into a coma.

The characters outwit the authorities, make deals with each other and undertake communal projects that bring them together, notably a theatre project.
Afro-pop music provides a background to the film.

Reception
Le Monde said that in this lively but disenchanted street the director José Laplaine brings his characters to life with humor and affection.  There is no real story ...
La Tribune Desfosses said that "With Macadam Tribu, the Zairian José Laplaine directs a story of a warm African city punctuated by the music of Papa Wemba, the Zairian rumba king. ".

Festivals

The film was shown at a number of festivals:

Cannes 1996
Montréal 1996 - Films du Monde
Locarno 1996
Toronto 1996
Los Angeles1996
Carthage 1996 - Prize for the best first work. Prix du COE
Amiens 1996 - Compétition
Nantes 1996 - Section Regards pluriels
Namur 1996 - CICAE prize
Rotterdam 1997
Manosque 1997
Fribourg 1997 - Panorama
Fespaco 1997
Milan 1997
Amiens 2001
SALLE : 12.02.1997

See also
 List of submissions to the 70th Academy Awards for Best Foreign Language Film
 List of Democratic Republic of the Congo submissions for the Academy Award for Best Foreign Language Film

References

External links
 

1996 films
1996 comedy-drama films
Democratic Republic of the Congo comedy films
1990s French-language films
Films set in the Democratic Republic of the Congo
Democratic Republic of the Congo drama films